Lieutenant Colonel Boyd David "Buzz" Wagner (October 26, 1916 – November 29, 1942) was an American aviator and the first United States Army Air Forces (USAAF) fighter ace of World War II.

Early life
Wagner was born October 26, 1916 in Emeigh, Cambria County, Pennsylvania, the son of Boyd M. and Elizabeth M. Moody Wagner. He grew up in Nanty-Glo, near Johnstown, and studied aeronautical engineering at the University of Pittsburgh for three years before joining the Army Air Corps.

Military career
Wagner completed flight training in June 1938 and was assigned to duty in the Philippines with the 24th Pursuit Group. He was soon given command of the 17th Pursuit Squadron.

He was nicknamed "Buzz" because it was said he could buzz the camouflage off a hangar roof.

Wagner was a first lieutenant commanding the 17th Pursuit Squadron stationed at Nichols Field on December 8, 1941, when the first Japanese air attacks struck the Philippines. On December 12, Wagner took off in a Curtiss P-40 on a solo reconnaissance mission over Aparri, where he was attacked by Japanese Mitsubishi A6M Zero fighters. He dove away from the attacking planes and then returned and shot down two of them. He was attacked by more Zeros as he strafed a nearby Japanese airfield and subsequently destroyed two of these planes as well before returning to Clark Field.

On December 17, he led an attack on a Japanese airstrip near Vigan with Lieutenants Allison W. Strauss and Russell M. Church, Jr. Church was killed in the attack and posthumously received the Distinguished Service Cross. Wagner and Strauss continued the strafing attack on the airfield, damaging and destroying numerous Japanese planes. A sole Japanese Zero took off and attacked Wagner's plane, but he chopped his throttle and caused the Zero to overshoot his plane. Once in position behind the Zero, Wagner was able to shoot it down, becoming the first USAAF ace of World War II and earning a Distinguished Service Cross.

At least one source states that Wagner's first five kills were not Zeros, but were IJAAF Nakajima Ki-27 "Nate" fighter planes. This source does confirm his later kills were reported as Zeros, but were impossible to verify from Japanese records.

It is confirmed that the Appari Japanese fighters Wagner shot down were not Navy "Zeros," but Army "Nates," by Wagner's own account: "Looking back, I saw two Japanese pursuit behind me and three more overhead, low-wing fixed landing gear single seaters (j.k. This is the description for a Nate," not a "Zero."), so I pulled nose-up and continued to climb directly into the sun at full throttle and low pitch. Now the two Nippos who fired on me lost me. I went into a half barrel roll onto their tails from my upper position and attacked them from the rear. They were in close formation and both burst into flames almost simultaneously, the fliers going down with their planes." This is as quoted in "Doomed From the Start"; William H. Bartsch; p. 157: Sorry if I proceeded incorrectly, but the information is accurate—Jerry Kruth; researching Bataan; 7/5/2019

Attacking the Japanese again at Vigan on December 22, his plane was struck by enemy fire and he was wounded by glass splinters which struck his face and eyes. He returned to base safely and evacuated to Australia in January 1942.

Wagner was promoted to lieutenant colonel and assigned in April to the 8th Fighter Group in New Guinea flying the Bell P-39. At the time, he was the youngest lieutenant colonel in the US Army. On April 30, 1942 he shot down three Zeros, bringing his air-to-air kill total to eight.

It was decided that Wagner's experience and knowledge would be more valuable back in the U.S., training fighter pilots and as a liaison to the Curtiss P-40 plant in Buffalo, New York, to help engineers improve the P-40's combat performance. Despite his protests at being pulled out of combat, he was sent home to the United States.

Death
On a routine flight in a P-40K from Eglin Field, Florida to Maxwell Field, Alabama on November 29, 1942, Wagner's plane disappeared. The cause of the crash, if known, was never revealed.

Wagner's partial remains were returned to Johnstown, Pa for burial. An estimated 15,000 to 20,000 mourners attended his funeral at Grandview Cemetery, Johnstown, Pa in January 1943. Both Time and Life covered the event.

After five years of research, retired Air Force Colonel Jim Moschgat rediscovered what he believed to be the crash site of Wagner's plane in Florida and found artifacts that tentatively confirmed the crash site was the correct one. Human remains were found at the site in 2008. In 2010, the remains were confirmed as being Lieutenant Colonel Wagner's. These additional remains were buried with full military honors, to include a fly over by the U.S. Air Force at the Grandview Cemetery, Johnstown, Pennsylvania

Honors

Distinguished Service Cross citation
For extraordinary heroism in action near Vigan, Abra, Philippine Islands, on December 16, 1941. While leading a reconnaissance mission Lieutenant Wagner left one airplane of his formation above a hostile airfield to continue observation and with a companion drove through heavy enemy anti-aircraft fire to obtain vital information. Observing about twenty-five hostile airplanes on the landing strip he dove directly on them releasing six fragmentation bombs and making several direct hits. In spite of being left unsupported due to the destruction of the accompanying airplane he continued his attack sweeping the hostile airplanes on the ground five times with machine gun fire and setting fire to the enemy's fuel supply before returning to report the accomplishment of his mission.

In addition to the Distinguished Service Cross, Wagner also received the Distinguished Flying Cross and the Purple Heart.

Two schools at Clark Air Base were named in honor of Boyd Wagner: Wagner High School and Wagner Middle School.

See also

 History of Clark Air Base
 List of solved missing person cases
 List of World War II flying aces

References

External links

 Boyd D. Wagner at Ancestry.Com
 

1916 births
1940s missing person cases
1942 deaths
Accidental deaths in Florida
Aerial disappearances
American World War II flying aces
Aviators from Pennsylvania
Aviators killed in aviation accidents or incidents in the United States
Formerly missing people
Missing in action of World War II
People from Johnstown, Pennsylvania
Recipients of the Distinguished Flying Cross (United States)
Recipients of the Distinguished Service Cross (United States)
Swanson School of Engineering alumni
United States Army Air Forces officers
United States Army Air Forces personnel killed in World War II
United States Army Air Forces pilots of World War II
Victims of aviation accidents or incidents in 1942
Military personnel from Pennsylvania